Mühlbach (in its upper course: Ruthsenbach) is a river of Hesse, Germany. It is a tributary of the Schwarzbach near Groß Gerau.

See also
List of rivers of Hesse

References

Rivers of Hesse
Rivers of Germany